Bidyananda Singh Ningthoujam (born 27 November 1997) is an Indian professional footballer who plays as a midfielder for I-League club TRAU.

Career

Early career
Born in Manipur, to a Hindu Meitei family. Bidyananda was selected for the Sports Authority of India in 2008 at the age of 11. The move to the Sports Authority of India was a major decision for Singh, as it allowed his family to not have to pay for his care as the academy would pay for his football coaching and his food: "Moving to the SAI complex meant that my parents didn’t have to worry about my meals, nor did they have to worry about my equipment as the academy provided me with the boots and kit." Singh soon impressed scouts from the All India Football Federation under-13 side and was called up for international camps. In 2014, he was one of two Indians who played in a one-week camp at the Aspire Academy in Qatar. After the camp, Bidyananda became the second Indian, after Milan Basumatary, to be selected into the tournament all-star side. Singh also impressed scouts well enough at the tournament to be scouted by Spanish side Barcelona. After returning from Qatar, Singh played for the AIFF Elite Academy.

Atlético Kolkata
On 14 June 2016 it was announced that Bidyananda, along with a host of other Indian players, had signed with Atlético Kolkata of the Indian Super League. He made his professional debut for the team on 25 October 2016 against Mumbai City.

Bengaluru
On 31 July 2017 Bidyananda signed two year contract with Bengaluru.

ATK Mohun Bagan
In 2021, Mohun Bagan have completed signing Bidyananda Singh from Mumbai City FC on a one year dal. He don't get many chance's that season besides some substitute playing time. He left ATKMB after his contract period ended.

RoundGlass Punjab
In 2022, RoundGlass Punjab completed signing Bidyananda Singh from Atk Mohun Bagan

International
Bidyananda has played for India at the under-13 and under-19 levels.

Career statistics

Club

Honours
Atletico de Kolkata
 Indian Super League: 2016

References

External links 

1997 births
Living people
People from Manipur
Indian footballers
Bengaluru FC players
Association football midfielders
Footballers from Manipur
Indian Super League players
India youth international footballers